Dzhurovo is a village in Bulgaria. It is situated in Pravets municipality, Sofia region.

References

Villages in Sofia Province